Lautaro Island is an island  long, lying just west of Lemaire Island in Gerlache Strait, off the Antarctic Peninsula. It was probably first seen by the Belgian Antarctic Expedition (1897–99) under Gerlache. The island was named by the Chilean Antarctic Expedition (1948–49) after the Lautaro, one of the Chilean expedition ships working in the area that season.

See also 
 List of antarctic and sub-antarctic islands

References

Islands of the Palmer Archipelago